Osaki is a type of spirit possession of a fox told about in legends of Japan.

Osaki, Ōsaki or Ohsaki may also refer to:

 3626 Ohsaki, a main-belt asteroid
 Ōsaki, Kagoshima, Japan
 Ōsaki, Miyagi, Japan
 Ōsaki, Tokyo, a neighborhood in Shinagawa, Tokyo, Japan
 Ōsaki (surname), a Japanese surname
 Ōsaki Station, a railway station in Shinagawa, Tokyo, Japan